Francis Richard Charles Guy Greville, 5th Earl of Warwick (9 February 1853 – 15 January 1924), styled Lord Brooke until 1893, was a British Conservative politician.

Early life
Greville was the son of George Greville, 4th Earl of Warwick, and his wife, Lady Anne, daughter of Francis Wemyss-Charteris, 9th Earl of Wemyss, and was educated at Eton and Christ Church, Oxford.

On 28 February 1874, he was appointed a supernumerary sub-lieutenant in the Warwickshire Yeomanry. Brooke was appointed a deputy lieutenant of Warwickshire on 3 March 1875 and promoted to captain in the Yeomanry on 26 August 1876.

Career
He entered Parliament for Somerset East in an 1879 by-election, a seat he held until 1885, and later represented Colchester from 1888 to 1892. The following year, Greville succeeded his father in the earldom and entered the House of Lords.

In August 1901, he was appointed Lord-Lieutenant of Essex, serving as such until 1919. He was appointed deputy lieutenant of the county on 8 July 1919. In November 1901 he was appointed Honorary Colonel of the new Essex Imperial Yeomanry Regiment, and in late 1901 he was elected Mayor of Warwick for the following year.

He was a senior Freemason under the United Grand Lodge of England, and rose to the office of Deputy Grand Master under the Grand Mastership of Albert Edward, Prince of Wales, later King Edward VII. He was also a member of the Ancient Order of Druids (AOD); in August 1905 he was one of the British aristocrat members of the Order who participated in the first ceremony organized by the AOD at Stonehenge.

Personal life
Lord Warwick married Frances Evelyn Maynard (10 December 1861 – 26 July 1938), daughter of Charles Henry Maynard, in 1881.  They had five children:

 Leopold Guy Francis Maynard Greville, 6th Earl of Warwick (10 September 1882 – 31 January 1928)
 Lady Marjorie Blanche Eva Greville (25 October 1884 – 25 July 1964); Charles Duncombe, 2nd Earl of Feversham
 Charles Algernon Cromartie Greville (22 November 1885 – 28 March 1887)
 Maynard Greville (21 March 1898 – 21 February 1960)
 Lady Mercy Greville (3 April 1904 – 21 November 1968). She married first Basil Dean and later, in 1936, Patrick Gamble.

The youngest two children were reputedly fathered by one of the countess' lovers, millionaire bachelor Joseph Laycock.

Francis Greville, 5th Earl of Warwick died in January 1924, aged 70, and is buried in the Collegiate Church of St Mary, Warwick. He was succeeded in the earldom by his eldest son Leopold. The Countess of Warwick died in July 1938, aged 76.

References

Further reading 
Kidd, Charles, Williamson, David (editors). Debrett's Peerage and Baronetage (1990 edition). New York: St Martin's Press, 1990,

External links 

 

1853 births
1924 deaths
Alumni of Christ Church, Oxford
Brooke, Francis Greville, Lord
Earls in the Peerage of Great Britain
Lord-Lieutenants of Essex
People educated at Eton College
Brooke, Francis Greville, Lord
Brooke, Francis Greville, Lord
Brooke, Francis Greville, Lord
Warwick, E5
Francis
Deputy Lieutenants of Essex
5
Essex Yeomanry officers
Warwickshire Yeomanry officers
Deputy Lieutenants of Warwickshire
Members of the Ancient Order of Druids